Lawrence W. Ledvina (September 28, 1880 – September 26, 1932) was an American politician and lawyer.

Born in Kellnersville, Wisconsin, in the town of Franklin, Manitowoc County, Wisconsin, Ledvina taught school in Manitowoc County. In 1906, Ledvina graduated from University of Wisconsin Law School and then practiced law in Manitowoc and Two Rivers, Wisconsin. Ledvina then served in the Wisconsin State Assembly from 1905 to 1911 and was a Republican.

He then served in the United States Navy during World War I. Ledvina helped organize the State Bank of Manitowoc.

Ledvina died of an embolism in a hospital in Manitowoc, Wisconsin on September 26, 1932.

References

1880 births
1932 deaths
People from Manitowoc County, Wisconsin
University of Wisconsin Law School alumni
Military personnel from Wisconsin
United States Navy personnel of World War I
Educators from Wisconsin
Businesspeople from Wisconsin
Wisconsin lawyers
20th-century American politicians
20th-century American businesspeople
20th-century American lawyers
Republican Party members of the Wisconsin State Assembly